Dick Lukkien (born 28 March 1972) is a Dutch football manager and former footballer currently in charge of Eredivisie club FC Emmen.

Playing career 

From 1991 to 1996 he played 90 times and scored once for BV Veendam. He then played for SVBO and Appingedam.

Coaching career

BV Veendam

Lukkien was the assistant manager at SC Veendam from 2002 to 2010.

Jong FC Groningen

Lukkien became head coach and managed Jong FC Groningen from 2010 to 2013.

FC Groningen
 
In July 2011 he was appointed assistant manager. Groningen won the KNVB Cup in 2015 and finished runner-up in the Johan Cruyff Shield the same year. He extended his contract to 2018.

FC Emmen

On 14 March 2016 it was announced that Lukkien would be the manager of FC Emmen for the next two seasons.
He won the Bronzen Stier for being the best manager in the third period of the 2017/18 season. Emmen were promoted to the Eredivisie for the first time in 2018 and finished fourteenth the following season. In 2020–21, Emmen relegated back to the Eerste Divisie.

On 15 April 2022, Lukkien and Emmen promoted back to the Eredivisie after just one year absence.

Managerial statistics

|}

References 

1972 births
Living people
Footballers from Groningen (province)
Dutch footballers
Association football defenders
SC Veendam players
Dutch football managers
FC Emmen managers
Eredivisie managers
Eerste Divisie managers